I'm Talking are an Australian funk-pop rock band, which featured vocalists Kate Ceberano and Zan Abeyratne. They formed in 1983 in Melbourne and provided top ten hit singles "Trust Me", "Do You Wanna Be?" and "Holy Word" and a top fifteen album, Bear Witness, before disbanding in 1987. The group reunited in October 2018, and went on a 2019 tour as well as a series of small venue shows.

History

1983–1987: Bear Witness
After the break-up of Melbourne-based experimental funk band Essendon Airport in 1983, members Robert Goodge on guitar, Ian Cox on saxophone and Barbara Hogarth on bass guitar set about forming a band to create inventive, commercial, funk-pop music. I'm Talking's original line-up was Kate Ceberano on vocals (ex-Expozay, Hoagy Cats), Stephen Charlesworth on keyboards, Cox, Goodge, Hogarth and Cameron Newman on drums. They introduced sophisticated dance beat music to the pub rock scene, performing for a year before recording their debut release. The EP Someday was released in May 1984 on the independent Randelli label. They also contributed to the soundtrack of the short film More Love Stories and songs "Here, There and Everywhere" and "Scratching" on the ABC compilation EP Cooking with George. They attracted the attention of manager Ken West and then signed to Regular Records. Zan Abeyratne (ex-Grand Wazoo, Bang) joined as a second lead vocalist.

I'm Talking released "Trust Me" in November 1984, which peaked at #10 on the Kent Music Report for the Australian singles charts. This was followed by "Lead the Way" in June 1985, then a cover of the Rose Royce song "Love Don't Live Here Anymore" in August, which both peaked into the top thirty. Although their songs were initially credited to the band as a whole (i.e. I'm Talking), in fact Goodge and Cox wrote virtually all the music and lyrics. The group won 'Best New Talent' and 'Best Debut Single' for "Trust Me" for 1984 at the Countdown Awards ceremony broadcast in 1985. On 13 July, I'm Talking performed "Lead the Way" in the 1985 Oz for Africa concert (part of the global Live Aid program). It was broadcast in Australia (on both the Seven Network and Nine Network) and on MTV in the US.

I'm Talking recorded their debut album Bear Witness in Melbourne, it was released in August 1986. Produced by Fred Maher (drummer for Scritti Politti) and Martyn Webster, it peaked at #14 in the albums charts, and spawned three more singles for their Australian label Regular Records. "Do You Wanna Be?", entered the charts in May and peaked at #8, becoming their highest charting single. "Holy Word", released in July 1986, featured solo vocals by Abeyratne and peaked at #9. "How Can It Be?" was released in October 1986, and although it failed to enter the top 100, it was listed among a list of singles receiving significant sales reports beyond the top 100 in November 1986. They signed to London Records in the UK but disagreements between the band and that label led to "Do You Wanna Be?" being the only single released outside of Oceania. "Holy Word" appeared on the soundtrack to the 1987 horror film Howling III. At least three of their songs later appeared in the 1988 film For Queen & Country.

After returning from their 1986 UK tour supporting Five Star, there were line-up changes, Warren McLean (ex-Machinations) replaced Newman on drums and Kevin Wiltshire was 'imported' from the UK tour as a second keyboardist. That line-up appeared on the national Australian Made tour of January 1987. By March, Abeyratne, Charlesworth and McLean had left. New members were John McAll on keyboards, Philip Jackson on drum machine and electronics, Susie Ahern on backing vocals, and rapper Tricky J (Julien Lodge). New material was performed live by this line-up, but none was recorded. Ceberano won 'Most Popular Female Performer' for 1986 at the final Countdown Awards held in 1987. New material was performed live in 1987, but Ceberano departed to pursue her solo career and I'm Talking disbanded in July 1987. In 1988, a compilation, Dancing was released by Regular Records.

1988–2017: After I'm Talking
After the break-up of I'm Talking, Ceberano launched her solo career; Abeyratne released three solo singles. Goodge, Cox and David Chesworth collaborated again in 1990 in the group "Power Trip featuring Mr Larry Weems". Goodge also went into partnership with Gavin Campbell and Paul Main in the '90s to form Filthy Lucre, specialising in remixes. They were responsible for transforming Yothu Yindi's folk-rock song "Treaty" into a dance-groove hit single. Goodge has also written and performed with Stephen Cummings since the 1990s. I'm Talking's manager, West, handled Ceberano for a brief time before going into partnership with Vivian Lees and launching their national rock festival The Big Day Out. John McAll went on to play and record with Goodge's former collaborator David Chesworth, and other jazz and rock acts.

In 2003 Goodge revived a trio of Essendon Airport with David Chesworth and Graham Lee. In 2007 Kate Ceberano appeared in the Countdown Spectacular 2 performing versions of I'm Talking's "Trust Me" and "Love Don't Live Here Anymore". As of 2008 Cox is a conservator at the State Library of Victoria. In October 2010, Bear Witness (1986) was listed in the book, 100 Best Australian Albums.

In 2014, Ceberano released her memoir, I'm Talking: My life, my words, my music, published by Hachette Australia. Ceberano co-wrote the book with Tom Gilling.

===2018–present: Reunion and Dyin' to Be Dancin'''===
In March 2018 Bear Witness was re-released with additional tracks, and the band started an official YouTube channel. The album was re-mastered for vinyl, cd, and digital download.

On 16 October 2018, the members of I'm Talking announced their return to the stage in 2019 as the supporting act for Bryan Ferry's Australian tour, between February and April. The reformed lineup consists of five of the seven original members: Goodge, Hogarth, Charlesworth, Ceberano, and Abeyratne. Ian Cox and Cameron Newman did not return due to personal commitments. The group also have not ruled out about whether they'll record or perform any new material beyond that. About the reunited group, Ceberano stated that she was "very excited about performing with I'm Talking again after so many years," adding that "[t]he music still sounds so great – fans are gonna love it!"Kate Ceberano: "I never thought this would happen." from News.com (18 October 2018) On 9 November 2018, the group performed an acoustic set of cover songs during a segment on Myf Warhurst's ABC Radio program. The group later performed a special concert for their fans in Melbourne on 11 February 2019, which received great reviews. On 15 February 2019, the group released a live album titled Dyin' to Be Dancin, which was recorded between 1984-1986. With the success of the reunion and renewed interest from its fan base, the members have already signaled intentions to do more shows and possibly work on new music in the future. In July 2019, the group released new remixes for the songs "It's Over" (an album track on Bear Witness) and "Cry Me a River" (originally a b-side on the single "Love Don't Live Here Anymore").

In February 2020, the group released a 6-track remix single of "Holy Word".

 Members 
Summarised from sources:
Kate Ceberano – vocals (1983–1987, 2019)
Stephen Charlesworth – keyboards (1983–1987, 2019)
Ian Cox – saxophone (1983–1987)
Robert Goodge – guitar (1983–1987, 2019)
Barbara Hogarth – bass guitar (1983–1987, 2019)
Cameron Newman – drums (1983–1986)
Zan Abeyratne – vocals (1984–1987, 2019)
Warren McLean – drums (1986–1987)
Kevin Wiltshire – keyboards (1986–1987 session musician)
John McAll – keyboards (1987)
Philip Jackson – drum machine, electronics (1987)
Tricky J (Julien Lodge) – rapping (1987)
Susie Ahern – backing vocals (1987)
Miles Henry – drums (2019)
Brodie Everist – saxophone (2019)

 Discography 
Albums

Extended play

Singles

Awards and nominations
ARIA Music Awards
The ARIA Music Awards is an annual awards ceremony that recognises excellence, innovation, and achievement across all genres of Australian music. They commenced in 1987.

|-
| ARIA Music Awards of 1987
| Richard Alan forBear Witness by I'm Talking
| ARIA Award for Best Cover Art
| 

Countdown Music AwardsCountdown was an Australian pop music TV series on national broadcaster ABC-TV from 1974–1987, it presented music awards from 1979–1987, initially in conjunction with magazine TV Week. The TV Week / Countdown Awards were a combination of popular-voted and peer-voted awards.

|-
| rowspan="3" |1984
| "Trust Me"
| Best Debut Single
| 
|-
| Kate Ceberarno in "Trust Me" (I'm Talking)
| Best Female Performance in a Video
| 
|-
| I'm Talking
| Most Promising Talent
| 
|-
|1986
| Bear Witness| Best Debut Album
| 
|-

Further readingPay to Play by Wendy Milson, Helen Thomas and Ponch Hawkes, Penguin 1986 (Includes interview with Cox and Goodge)
Baker, Glenn A.; Bob King (1987). Glenn A. Baker, ed. Australian made, gonna have a good time tonight : the authorised documentary of the event. Sydney, N.S.W.: Fontana Collins. . (book of the January 1987 live tour)Dig: Australian Rock and Pop Music 1960-1985'' by David Nichols, 2016

References

External links
Kate Ceberano official site
I’m Talking facebook page
Zan Abeyratne Music

1983 establishments in Australia
1987 disestablishments in Australia
Australian electronic dance music groups
Victoria (Australia) musical groups
Musical groups established in 1983
Musical groups disestablished in 1987
Musical groups reestablished in 2018
Kate Ceberano